Mount Joffre is a mountain located on the Continental Divide, in Peter Lougheed Provincial Park, Alberta, and Elk Lakes and Height of the Rockies Provincial Parks in British Columbia.  The mountain was named in 1918 by the Interprovincial Boundary Survey after Marshal Joseph Joffre, commander-in-chief of the French Army during World War I.

The normal climbing route (UIAA class II) is via the north face, which is covered by the Mangin Glacier.

See also
 List of mountain peaks of North America
 List of mountains in the Canadian Rockies

References

Further reading 
 
 Alan Kane, Scrambles in the Canadian Rockies – New Edition
 Aaron Cameron, Matt Gunn, Hikes Around Invermere & the Columbia River Valley, P 179

Three-thousanders of Alberta
Three-thousanders of British Columbia
Regional District of East Kootenay
Canadian Rockies
Borders of Alberta
Borders of British Columbia